Yun Jong-im (born 5 January 1943) is a South Korean cross-country skier. He competed in the men's 15 kilometre event at the 1968 Winter Olympics.

References

External links
 

1943 births
Living people
South Korean male cross-country skiers
Olympic cross-country skiers of South Korea
Cross-country skiers at the 1968 Winter Olympics
20th-century South Korean people